Joshua Spanogle is a physician and a novelist.  He graduated from Yale University and Stanford Medical School.  He has written the bestselling medico-science thrillers Isolation Ward (2006) and Flawless (2007).  Spanogle has worked in medical ethics, and his books involve current ethical issues set in the biotechnology industry.

References 

Yale University alumni
Stanford University School of Medicine alumni
21st-century American physicians
21st-century American novelists
American male novelists
Living people
21st-century American male writers
Year of birth missing (living people)